= Berta Ottenstein =

German dermatologist (1891–1956)

Berta Ottenstein (27 March 1891 in Nuremberg – 17 June 1956 near Concord, Massachusetts) was a German dermatologist who was the first woman to obtain her habilitation at the University of Freiburg im Breisgau and the first woman in Germany to habilitate in dermatology.

== Life ==
Ottenstein, the youngest of six children born into a Nuremberg merchant family, studied at the University of Erlangen, where she received her doctorate in chemistry in 1914. After a position at the Kaiser Wilhelm Institute for Biochemistry in Berlin-Dahlem (1927), she moved to the University of Freiburg in 1928, where she received an assistant post. As early as 1930, her superior, hospital director Georg Alexander Rost, expressed his intention to propose her for habilitation in the foreseeable future. The habilitation was approved by the Senate on 3 June 1931 and confirmed by the responsible Ministry in Karlsruhe on 11 June. Three weeks earlier, Ottenstein had already been awarded the degree at the medical faculty, so that she could take up a position as a private lecturer in the winter semester of 1931/32. The title of her habilitation thesis was "Untersuchungen über den Gehalt der Haut und des Blutes an diastatischem Ferment und dessen biochemische Bedeutung bei Hautkrankheiten" (Studies on the content of diastatic ferment in the skin and blood and its biochemical significance in skin diseases).

Ottenstein's contract with the University of Freiburg was extended for the last time in 1932, but even before it expired in autumn 1934 she was "granted leave" by the National Socialists because of her Jewish ancestry. Together with many other lecturers she had to leave the university on April 12, 1933.

1933-35 she held an assistant position at the dermatological clinic of Budapest before she changed to the University of Istanbul in 1935, where she worked as lecturer and head of the dermatological clinic until 1945. She then emigrated to the US, where she received a position as research fellow at Harvard University and worked at the New England Medical Center in Boston.

In 1951 Ottenstein was awarded an extraordinary professorship by the University of Freiburg and she received American citizenship.

== Reception ==
The University of Freiburg's Women's Promotion Prize has been called the Bertha Ottenstein Prize since 2005. According to the university's website, the prize is awarded for outstanding scientific achievements in the field of women's and gender studies, teaching concepts and seminar forms, training and further education programmes that integrate the aspect of gender equality in a cross-sectional way and stimulate gender-oriented processes of awareness building, networking, event or exhibition organisation on gender issues, above-average commitment to the implementation of Faculty Equality Plans and/or the Central Equality Plan, recruitment and staff development measures that are likely to increase the proportion of women at the individual skill levels at which they are under-represented, and innovative measures to improve the living, studying and working conditions of student and employed parents at the university. In Freiburg, a street in the Brühl-Beurbarung district on the former freight station site was named after Berta Ottenstein.

== Literature ==
- Ute Scherb: Ich stehe in der Sonne und fühle, wie meine Flügel wachsen. Studentinnen und Wissenschaftlerinnen an der Freiburger Universität von 1900 bis in die Gegenwart. Ulrike Helmer Verlag, Königstein/Taunus 2002, ISBN 3-89741-117-2
